Meriluoto is a surname. Notable people with the surname include:

Aila Meriluoto (1924–2019), Finnish poet, writer, and translator
Johan Meriluoto (born 1974), Finnish jumper
Kai Meriluoto (born 2003), Finnish footballer
Minna Meriluoto (born 1985), Finnish football goalkeeper
Päivi Meriluoto (born 1955), Finnish archer